Kapince is a village and municipality in the Nitra District in western central Slovakia, in the Nitra Region.

History
In historical records the village was first mentioned in 1261.

Geography
The village lies at an altitude of 155 metres and covers an area of 5.839 km². It has a population of about 193 people.

Ethnicity
The village's population is approximately 99% Slovak and 1% Magyar

Facilities
The village has a public library and football pitch.

See also
 List of municipalities and towns in Slovakia

References

Genealogical resources

The records for genealogical research are available at the state archive "Statny Archiv in Bratislava, Nitra, Slovakia"

 Roman Catholic church records (births/marriages/deaths): 1823-1897 (parish B)

External links
https://web.archive.org/web/20070513023228/http://www.statistics.sk/mosmis/eng/run.html
Surnames of living people in Kapince

Villages and municipalities in Nitra District